The 1808 United States presidential election in New York took place between November 4 and December 7, 1808, as part of the 1808 United States presidential election. The state legislature chose 19 representatives, or electors to the Electoral College, who voted for President and Vice President.

During this election, New York split its 19 electoral votes among two Democratic-Republican candidates. 13 electoral votes went to Secretary of State James Madison while the remaining 6 went to incumbent Vice President George Clinton. Clinton was also supported by a group of New York Democratic-Republicans for president even though he had remained the party's official vice presidential candidate.

This would be the final election until 1972 in which New York did not have the largest number of electors in the Electoral College.

See also
 United States presidential elections in New York

References

New York
1808
1808 New York (state) elections